Nawab Sir Khwaja Salimullah Bahadur  (7 June 1871 – 16 January 1915) was the fourth Nawab of Dhaka and one of the leading Muslim politicians during the British rule in India. In 1906, the Muslim League was officially founded at the educational conference held in Dhaka. The convention was held at Ahsan Manzil, the official residence of the Dhaka Nawab Family. Sir Salimullah was a key patron of education for the Eastern Bengal. He was one of the founders of the University of Dhaka and the prestigious Ahsanullah School of Engineering (now the Bangladesh University of Engineering and Technology). He was also a member of Bengal Legislative Assembly from 1913 till his death in Calcutta in 1915 at the age of 43. He was the founder President of Bengal Muslim League in 1907.

Politics
Salimullah began his career in government service in 1893 as Deputy Magistrate, a position he held until he departed in 1895 to start his business in Mymensingh. In 1901 he inherited the position as the head of the Dhaka Nawab Family following his father's death.

In 1903–04, Nawab Salimullah began supporting the partition of Bengal in the face of opposition of the Indian National Congress. On 16 October 1905, the day the Bengal Province was parted, Salimullah presided over a meeting of Muslim leaders from all over East Bengal in Northbrook Hall where a political front called Mohammedan Provincial Union was formed. With others of the front, Salimullah organized meetings around East Bengal in favor of the partition, while the Congress built up a movement to oppose it. On 14 and 15 April 1906, Salimullah organized and was named president at the first convention of East Bengal and Assam Provincial Educational Conference at Shahbag, Dhaka. Later that year, newspapers published a dispatch from Salimullah to various Muslim leaders around India urging to form an all-India political party he called Muslim All India Confederacy, and leaders of the Aligarh Movement requested him to convene the 20th meeting of the All India Mohammedan Educational Conference at his own cost. Over two thousand people covering Muslim leaders from all over India gathered at the Nawab's family garden-house in Shahbag, Dhaka for the conference held between 27 and 30 December 1906. On the last day, the assembly formed the All India Muslim League, appointing Nawab Salimullah the Vice President and placing him on a committee to craft its constitution. Two years later, in December 1908, Salimullah would speak out for free speech in educational institutes and also rights for Muslims to separate elections.

Throughout these years, Salimullah held positions of authority in several leagues and conferences and continued to speak out on important political issues. In 1907, he became president of the All Bengal Muslim League, formed newly Kolkata. In 1908, he became the  secretary of the newly established East Bengal and Assam Provincial Muslim League, becoming president in 1909. He served as the chairman at the 22nd Convention of the All India Mohammedan Educational Conference at Amritsar in December 1908. In 1909, he led people of wealth in the newly formed province to form the Imperial League of Eastern Bengal and Assam. In March 1911, at a meeting at the Ahsan Manzil, he presided over a decision to maintain the provincial Muslim League and provincial Educational Conference separate for political and educational activities. On 2 March 1912, Salimullah chaired a meeting at which the two Muslim Leagues of the Bengal were combined into the Presidency Muslim League and the two Muslim Associations were combined into the Bengal Presidency Muslim Association. Salimullah was made president of both the organisations.

In August 1911, Salimullah demanded a university for Dhaka at a function at a political function at Curzon Hall, but it was not until after the shock of the annulment of the partition by George V on 12 December 1911 that Salimullah was able to achieve this goal. Within days of the annulment, Salimullah submitted a list of demands to Viceroy Lord Hardinge to protect the interest of Muslims. In response, a pledge was made to establish a university at Dhaka and to provide for Muslims an education officer, which pledge led to the inclusion of an Islamic Studies Department in Dhaka University. Salimullah continued afterwards to champion this cause, making speeches to counter those who argued against it and, in 1914, organizing a convention on 11–12 April for the Muslim Education Conference of United Bengal.

Along with his continued championing of education, Salimullah's last focuses before withdrawing from active politics in 1914 included situations involving Turkey. In 1912, he raised money from East Bengal to assist Turkish Muslims threatened by the Balkan wars. During World War I, however, he supported the Allied Powers after Turkey aligned with Germany.

Honours
 Companion of the Order of the Star of India (CSI)-New Year Honours, 1906
 Knight Commander of the Order of the Star of India (KCSI)-New Year Honours, 1909
 Knight Grand Commander of the Order of the Indian Empire (GCIE)-23 December 1911

Personal life

Khwaja Salimullah was the eldest son of the third Nawab of Dhaka, Sir Khwaja Ahsanullah and his first wife Nawab Begum Wahidunnesa. He was the grandson of Nawab of Dhaka, Sir Khwaja Abdul Ghani. Nawab Khwaja Salimullah was born at the Ahsan Manzil Palace on 7 June 1871.

Wives
 Nawab Begum Asmatunnesa
 Nawab Begum Alima Bibi
 Nawab Begum Raushan Akhter
 Nawab Begum Naznijan
 Nawab Begum Ayesha 
 Nawab Begum Azizunnesa

Children
 With Nawab Begum Asmatunnesa:
 Nawab Khwaja Habibullah
 Begum Ayesha II
 With Nawab Begum Alima Bibi:
 Khwaja Alimullah II
 Khwaja Waliullah
 With Nawab Begum Raushan Akhter:
 Khwaja Hafizullah I
 Khwaja Nasrullah
 Ahmedi Bano
 With Nawab Begum Naznijan:
 Khurshid Bano
 Aftab Bano
 With Nawab Begum Azizunnesa:
 Khwaja Ahsanullah

Legacy
Several of Nawab Sir Salimullah's descendants went on to become prominent politicians in the later days of the British Raj and in Pakistan. They include one of his sons Khwaja Nasrullah who was the Governor of Calcutta, his grandson Sir Khwaja Nazimuddin who was the second Prime Minister of Pakistan, his grandson Khwaja Hassan Askari who became a Member of the National Assembly of Pakistan and also another grandson of his and The 5th Nawab's 3rd son Nawabjada Khawaja Tofeal Ahmed. He had played a role in bringing freedom to Bangladesh. Khawaja Tofeal Ahmed was a member of Awami league and was elected as Dhaka's MP in 1971 but unfortunately he was shot in front of his greenhouse on 18th Feb 1972.

Other family members also became prominent political figures.

Several places in Bangladesh have been dedicated in Sir Salimullah's name. They include most notably the following:

 Salimullah Muslim Hall, University of Dhaka
 Sir Salimullah Medical College, Dhaka
 Salimullah Muslim Orphanage
 Nawab Salimullah Road, Naryanganj

In 1990 the Pakistani government launched commemorative postage stamps honouring Sir Salimullah as one of the Pioneers of Freedom. In 1993 the Bangladeshi government launched a commemorative postage stamp in honour of Sir Salimullah.

References

Further reading
 

1871 births
1915 deaths
Nawabs of Dhaka
Indian knights
Leaders of the Pakistan Movement
Knights Grand Commander of the Order of the Indian Empire
Knights Commander of the Order of the Star of India
20th-century Bengalis
19th-century Bengalis